= Mukul Devichand =

Mukul Devichand (born in Wales, UK) is Editor of A.I. Initiatives at the New York Times, appointed in October 2025. He leads on new written and audio services that use AI. Previously he was Editor of Audio Programming at the NYT.

Devichand was previously BBC Executive Editor of Voice + AI. He was the original creator and editor of the Webby award-winning BBC Trending unit, and of the solutions-focussed journalism unit BBC World Hacks. Both teams are based in London and create digital video output, text, podcasts and radio shows for the BBC World Service and BBC News website. Previously he was a presenter and producer for BBC Radio 4. His work includes programmes such as Crossing Continents, Analysis, From Our Own Correspondent and The Report. He has also presented Our World, a BBC World TV show. In 2009, with Crossing Continents producer John Murphy, he won a One World Media Award for their reporting in Mumbai slums.

He is a graduate of the London School of Economics.
